Innocent Sinners is a 1958 British black and white film directed by Philip Leacock and starring Flora Robson.

It was based on the 1955 novel An Episode of Sparrows by Rumer Godden.

Plot
Olivia Chesney is too sick to leave home, somewhere in Battersea in London, but waves out of her window to various neighbours.

These include Lovejoy (June Archer) who is a neglected young girl in post-war London who finds solace in the secret garden which she creates on a bomb site.

Her motivations are mixed: she buys grass seed using borrowed money, and steals a net from a baby's pram to use to protect the seed growing. She steals money from the candle box in the church in order to buy a garden fork.

Lovejoy is being raised by the Vincents. Mr Vincent is a waiter in a posh restaurant and is very kind to Lovejoy. Her mother seems to have a dubious lifestyle when she visits Lovejoy, and she has "male callers" such as Col Baldcock who Lovejoy is asked to address as "uncle Francis". Mr Vincent asks her to leave.

A gang of young boys destroy Lovejoy's garden. One boy (Tip) returns her garden fork to her and suggests a better site: a bombed out church. They become friends. He makes her pay "penance" for stealing money from the church.

Mr Vincent buys two special plates to serve dessert on, but his wife chastises him, as they have bills to pay.

Meanwhile a couple are planning to restore the bombed church. A woman gives Lovejoy a shilling in the church and is impressed when she puts it straight into the candle box (as part of her penance).

The couple go to Vincent's restaurant to eat. They give Lovejoy a ride in their car and give her a miniature rose to plant in her garden. Olivia tries to help.

An old man gives Lovejoy some seedlings as it is too late to plant seeds. Her friend steals earth from the local park (much to the annoyance of the adults).

On a rainy night Tip brings Sparkey to the park to steal earth. Lovejoy gets arrested with the boys.

The police are aware that Lovejoy's mother is not around (she has actually gone to Canada and got married but doesn't want Lovejoy to follow).

The Vincents get into serious financial trouble and have to give Lovejoy away to the home, but Lovejoy runs off.

Cast
June Archer as Lovejoy Mason
Christopher Hey as Tip Malone
Brian Hammond as Sparkey
Flora Robson as Olivia Chesney
David Kossoff as George Vincent
Barbara Mullen as Mrs. Vincent
Catherine Lacey as Angela Chesney
Susan Beaumont as Liz
Lyndon Brook as Charles
Edward Chapman as Manley
John Rae as Mr. Isbister
Vanda Godsell as Bertha Mason - Lovejoy's Mother
Hilda Fenemore as Cassie
Pauline Delaney as Mrs. Malone
Andrew Cruickshank as Dr. Lynch-Cliffe
Cyril Chamberlain as Colonel Francis Baldock (uncredited)
Basil Dignam as Mr. Dyson - Olivia's Solicitor (uncredited)
William Squire as Father Lambert (uncredited)
Marianne Stone as Sparkey's Mother (uncredited)
Toke Townley as Bates (uncredited)

References

External links

Innocent Sinners at BFI

1958 films
1958 drama films
British drama films
British coming-of-age films
British black-and-white films
Films based on British novels
Films about children
Films directed by Philip Leacock
1950s English-language films
1950s British films